was a Japanese Buddhist monk of the Tendai school.  He was a scholar, editor and a literary critic.

His major work, Man'yōshū chūshaku, was completed in 1269.  This was a treatise on the collected poems in the Man'yōshū anthology. His work was instrumental in a process of rediscovering the original meaning of this seminal work of Japanese poetry.

Selected work
Sengaku's published writings encompass 9 works in 12 publications in 1 language and 53 library holdings.

  (1269);  Akihiro Satake, ed. (1981). ;  OCLC 23315980
  (1709) OCLC 069224675

Notes

References
 Nussbaum, Louis Frédéric and Käthe Roth. (2005). Japan Encyclopedia. Cambridge: Harvard University Press. ; OCLC 48943301

Further reading
 Shimura,  Shirō. (1999). . Tōkyo: Shintensha,

Japanese Buddhist clergy
Tendai
1203 births
1272 deaths
Kamakura period Buddhist clergy